Wladimiro Falcone (born 12 April 1995) is an Italian professional footballer who plays as a goalkeeper for  club Lecce, on loan from Sampdoria.

Club career

Sampdoria
Born in Rome, Falcone is a youth product of Ligurian club Sampdoria. He was the first choice of their reserve team from 2012 to 2014, while also appearing as unused bench for the first team.

Loans
On 25 July 2014, Falcone was signed by Lega Pro club Como in a temporary deal. The club won promotion to Serie B in 2015 as the promotion playoffs winner.

On 20 July 2015, he was signed by another third-level club, Savona, in a temporary deal.

On 9 July 2016, he left Samp once again for Livorno in another temporary deal. The club was relegated from Serie B to Lega Pro in 2016. On 31 January 2017, he returned to Sampdoria.

In July 2017, he joined Bassano on loan. But in January 2018, he left for Gavorrano. Later he went to Lucchese on loan.

Return and loan to Cosenza 
On 2019 he came back to Sampdoria, and he made his debut for the club on 29 July 2020 in a 1–4 loss against Milan.

On 29 August 2020, he extended his contract for Sampdoria until 2024; on the same day he went to Cosenza on a season loan.

During the whole 2020-21 season, Falcone established himself as the first-choice goalkeeper of the Silani and repeatedly stole the scene thanks to his performances, although he couldn't help Cosenza avoid relegation, as a 9-point gap between them and Ascoli allowed the latter team to stay in the second tier without playing a relegation play-out.

Loan to Lecce
On 17 July 2022, Falcone joined Lecce on a season-long loan.

International career
In 2014, Falcone was a second-choice keeper for Italy's U-19 side during the qualifiers for the UEFA European Under-19 Championship, behind Pierluigi Gollini.

On 17 March 2023, Falcone received his first official callup to the senior Italian national team for two UEFA Euro 2024 qualifying matches against England and Malta.

Personal life 
On 1 January 2022, he tested positive for COVID-19.

References

External links
 

Italian footballers
U.C. Sampdoria players
Como 1907 players
Savona F.B.C. players
U.S. Livorno 1915 players
Bassano Virtus 55 S.T. players
U.S. Gavorrano players
S.S.D. Lucchese 1905 players
Cosenza Calcio players
U.S. Lecce players
Serie A players
Serie B players
Serie C players
Italy youth international footballers
Association football goalkeepers
Footballers from Rome
1995 births
Living people